A message delivery agent (MDA), or mail delivery agent, is a computer software component that is responsible for the delivery of e-mail messages to a local recipient's mailbox. It is also called a local delivery agent (LDA).

Within the Internet mail architecture, local message delivery is achieved through a process of handling messages from the message transfer agent, and storing mail into the recipient's environment (typically a mailbox).

Implementation

Many mail handling software products bundle multiple message delivery agents with the message transfer agent component, providing for site customization of the specifics of mail delivery to a user.

Unix 

On Unix-like systems, procmail and maildrop are the most popular MDAs.  The Local Mail Transfer Protocol (LMTP) is a protocol that is frequently implemented by network-aware MDAs.

Invocation 

The mail delivery agent is generally not started from the command line, but is usually invoked by mail delivery subsystems, such as a mail transport agent, or a mail retrieval agent.

List of MDA software for Unix-like platforms 
 Cyrus IMAP - A mail server suite that includes a mail delivery agent
 dovecot - A mail server suite that includes a mail delivery agent
 fetchmail - Primarily a Mail retrieval agent (MRA)
 getmail - simpler, more secure, modern fetchmail alternative
 fdm — modern replacement for both fetchmail and procmail from the author of tmux
 maildrop or courier-maildrop - traditional procmail replacement, part of Courier Mail Server, but can also be used with other mail servers
 procmail - old, but still used
 bin/mail, the MDA part of Sendmail - Sendmail is one of the oldest email packages
 Sieve mail filtering language - a standardised mail filtering language; also, a modern replacement for procmail from the GNU Mailutils package

See also
 Message transfer agent (MTA)
 Mail retrieval agent (MRA)
 Message submission agent (MSA)
 Message user agent (MUA) a.k.a. email client
 E-mail agent (infrastructure) (MxA)

References